Gandii Baat (literally: Dirty Talk) is an Indian adult comedy web series directed by Sachin Mohite for ALTBalaji. Now this series has been removed from the ZEE5 and MX Player because of the adult content, since Indian government released new OTT Platform Rules.

Cast

Season 1

Episode 1 Threesome
 Neetha Shetty as Gunja
 Rohit Chaudhary as Naamvar
 Anant V Joshi as Doodnath
 Sonal Panvar as Roopa
 Aryan as Almaari

Episode 2 Tharki Buddha
 Lovely Sharma as Kajari
 Naveen Pandita as Pradeep
 Rajesh Tripathi as Rajendra
 Yamini Singh as Eekha
 Harsh Vardan as Kaju

Episode 3 Vasu Nag
 Mrinalini Tyagi as Chakor
 Ripraj Chauhan as Jeeva
 Kalyani C Chaitanya as Dhaani
 Deepika H Khanna as Imli
 Anshuman Puskar as Nagnath
 Nirban Goswani as Resham Singh
 Kirti Choudhary as Rimjhim
 Saurabh Singhal as Rakesh
 Sourav Bansal as Shiva
 Ashok Yadav as Hori

Episode 4 Preeto Rani
 Narayani Shastri as Preeto
 Vijay Chandrna as Lucky
 Rudra Kaushik as Chandiram
 Gourav Kumar as Suraj
 Meenakshi as Soni
 Bachan Pachera as Balli
 Vaibhav Shah as Gogi

Season 2

Episode 1 Bi-sexual
 Anveshi Jain as Neeta
 Flora Saini as Sajeeli
 Aman Maheshwari as Vaibhav
 Rahul Jaittly as Sagar

Episode 2 Jadui Mahal
 Sonam Arora as Roop
 Coral Bhamra as Sapna
 Maarisha K as Laachi
 Vinod Thirani as Laal Chand
 Sikandar Chohan as Sarpanch

Episode 3 Gibraltar
 Pradeep Duhan as Bhushan
  Nazneen Patni as Seema
 Agni Pawar as Maahi
 Manish Nawani as Mahesh
 Leena Acharya as Mohinihi

Episode 4 Love sex and betrayal
 Abhishek Gupta as Dugga
 Navneet Kaur as Sachi
 Ruby Bharaj as Heera
 Fahman Khan as Soma
 Tripti Agarwal as Ojha Maai
 Anil Bhagwat as Sukhiya
 Shiv Kumar Sharma as Yatin

Episode 5 Gudiya Rani
 Vikas Verma as Kishan Singh Sandhu
 Alpa Joshi as sukhi 
 Pari Goswami as Baani
 Naina Chhabra as Raashi 
 Raakeshh Dubey as Avtaar 
 Jayshree Bhalse as Pammi 
 Charu Srivastava as Champa 
 Sakshi Sharma as Suneeta
 Virendra Singh as Randheer

Season 3

Episode 1 Rajkumar
 Jatin Bhatia as Lakhan 
 Neetu Wadhwa as Ramya 
 Pallavi Mukherjee as Bicchi 
 Ankit Kumar Gupta as Awara 
 Zafar Warsi as Pagal 
 Ranveer Pratap Singh as Deewana 
 Bhavna Karekar as Kamal 
 Gautam Saugat as Old Man 
 Pankaj Kansara as Village Boy 
 Stan as Angrez

Episode 2 Harpreet Weds Harpreet
 Lalit Bisht as Joginder
 Sheeva Rana as Harpreet
 Shiny Dixit as Harpreet 2 
 Bhawsheel Sanni as Puppy
 Sunny Sachdeva as Jaspreet
 Mridula Mahajan as Lajjo
 Aabha Paul as Maami ji
 Farnaish Kaur as Manjeet
 S.p.s Sandhu as Manpreet 1 Dad
 Raman Dhagga as Harpreet 2 Dad
 Rajinder Rozy as Harpreet 2 Mom
 Akash Singh as Harpreet's secret lover

Episode 3 Sonam Chadh Gayi
 Aasma Syed as Sonam
 Rushali Arora as Sumitra 
 Yajuvendra Singh as Netaji
 Tarun Dudeja as Vishal
 Jay Kumar as Rohan
 Akhil Vaidya as Station Master
 Anurag Mishra as Police Inspector
 Prashant Kumar as Pa Of Netaji
 Sujail Khan as Tt
 Akshay Kumar as Customer 426
 Ajay Raman as Customer 427
 Paras Randhawa as Sumitra's customer
 Uddhav Dharap as Announcer
 Yogi Raj as Kasai wath mujo obama

Episode 4 Honeymoon On Wheel
 Shikha Thakur as Sexy
 Kunwar Vikram Soni as Neeraj
 Palak Singh as Laxmi
 Rishikesh Ingley as Vaibhav
 Rohit Sharma as Bajrang
 Romit Baweja as Deepak
 Gehana Vasishth as Swati
 Arjun Khurana as Vimal
 Nehal Valodiya as Vimla

Season 4

Episode 1 Betaab Dil Ki Tamanna
 Ankit bhardwaj as Amar
 Ashish Dixit as Prem
 Saba Saudagar as Kanchan
 Megha Prasad as Suman
 Rohit Kumar as Brijesh

Episode 2 Woh Saat Din
 Yash Choudhury as Basant
 Edin Rose as Vasudha
 Nishikant Dixit as Mahipal
 Puja Jha as Taara
 Jay GB Patel as Ashok
 Gunjan Aras as Seema

Episode 3 Mera Pyaar Paan Nahi Jise khaya or thook diya
 Rishabh Shukla as Jayant
 Garima Jain as Kamlesh
 Ibra Khan as Megha
 Arsh Merchant as Kamlesh's husband 
 Shashwant Jain as Nandu

Episode 4 ***** Pati Mera
 Urmimala Sinha Roy as Priya
 Jolly Bhatia as Rukhi 
 Vikranth Thakry as Mohan
 Pawan Kumar as Suresh
 Salman Shaikh as Birju
 Kuldeep Singh as Guddu 
 Neha Pal as Usha 
 Taniya Chatterjree as Chandani 
 Akansha Verma as Lata 
 Avantika Mishra as Anjali
 Nataliya Kozhenova as Christie
 Vikash Pandey as Naate

Episode 5 Meetha Meetha Pyara Pyara
 Mridula Mahajan as Kusuma
 Aditya Singh Rajput as Savan
 Sneha Mishra as Roopa
 Rohit Mishra as Raghu
 Sanjana Padke as Sheela
 Liza Sing as Shilpa
 Sharwani Goswami as Alka
 Saundarya Seth as student at pathshala
 Jaimin Panchal as student 2 at pathshala

Season 5

Episode 1 Erotic Tales of Madhosh Madan
 Lakshya Handa as Chandan
 Guru Haryani as Ranjeet Sir
 Piyali Munsi as lalita Madam
 Satakshi Shorya as Neeli 
 Parichay Sharma as Puppy
 Neelam Bhanushali as Beena Madam
 Aalya Singh as Sukhekha Madam

Episode 2 Game of Love
 Amika Shail as Priyanka 
 Farmaan Haider as Santosh
 Pooja Dey as Nandini

Episode 3 Happy Valentine’s Day
 Nitin Bhatiya as Manoj
 Sanya Bansal as Meera 
 Savant Singh Premi as Vaibhav
 Aadita Jain as Jyoti

Episode 4 Pintu's 5 Million Followers
 Sudhir as Pintu 
 Ankit Bhatia as Dev 
 Pamela Mondal as Muskaan

Season 6

Episode 1 Who Killed My Wife
 Keval Dasani as Diwakar
 Mahima Gupta as Sarika
 Alisha Khan as Malti
 Deepak Gupta as Paras
 Nidhi Mahawan as Shills
 Mohit Sharma as Mandar
 Riya R Patwa as Sumitra

Episode 2 Experiment
 Kunwar Vikram Singh as Parimal
 Anjali Banerjee as Mohini
 Zoya Khan as Ruby
 Guru Haryani as Senior Cop
 Utkarsh Arora as Shekar
 Tripti Bajoria as Banita, Boss
 Romita Sarkar as Neelakshi, Youtber
 Guru Haryani as Cop
 Aanchal as Cop

Episodes

Season 1

Season 2

Season 3

Season 4

Season 5

Season 6

References

External links 

Gandii Baat at ALTBalaji
Gandii Baat at ZEE5 (season 4 and 5)

2018 web series debuts
ALTBalaji original programming
Indian drama web series
Hindi-language web series
Indian LGBT-related web series